= Dharamkot Bagga =

- Village
- Interactive map of Dharamkot Bagga
- Country: India
- State: Punjab
- District: Gurdaspur
- Tehsil: Batala
- Region: Majha

Government
  - Type: Panchayat raj
  - Body: Gram panchayat

Population (2011)
  - Total: 3,379
  - Total Households: 664
- Sex ratio 1768/1611 ♂/♀

Languages
  - Official: Punjabi
- Time zone: UTC+5:30 (IST)
- Telephone: 01871
- ISO 3166 code: IN-PB
- Vehicle registration: PB-18
- Website: gurdaspur.nic.in

Dharamkot Bagga is a village in Batala in Gurdaspur district of Punjab State, India. The village is administrated by Sarpanch an elected representative of the village. Prabhjot born on 22 Jan 1986 in this village. He did his Graduation from Baring union Christian College under Guru nanak dev University. After completion his graduation, he enrolled in Indian Army as officer.

== Demography ==
As of 2011, the village has a total number of 664 houses and a population of 3379 of which 1768 are males while 1611 are females according to the report published by Census India in 2011. The literacy rate of the village is 68.71%, lower than the state average of 75.84%. The population of children under the age of 6 years is 426 which is 12.61% of total population of the village, and child sex ratio is approximately 1088 higher than the state average of 846.

== See also ==
- List of villages in India
